Groom of the Robes is an office in the Royal Household of the Sovereign of England (later Great Britain, ultimately the United Kingdom). In 1953, the Groom of the Robes to Elizabeth II had the task of bringing forward the robes and other items of ceremonial clothing worn by the monarch at various points in the coronation service, ready to hand them over to the Mistress of the Robes and the Lord Great Chamberlain (who assisted The Queen in putting them on) and to receive and remove those which were no longer required.

Although the post has remained unfilled since 1954, an Equerry is usually designated 'Acting Groom of the Robes' on occasions (such as the State Opening of Parliament) when robes are worn.

List of Grooms of the Robes
(incomplete)
Thomas Purcell
Piers Curteys
John Hart

Henry VIII
Richard Cecil 1530 
John Copinger 
William Sharington 1540–1541
Thomas Sternhold 1500–1549 
Gates, Sir John

Edward VI
 Robert Robotham

Victoria
Francis Seymour 1837-1870 
Henry Erskine 1870–1901

Edward VII
Henry Erskine 1901–1910

George V
Henry Erskine 1910–1920
Montague Eliot 1920-1936

George VI
Sir Harold Campbell 1937-1952

Elizabeth II
Sir Harold Campbell 1952-1954

See also
Groom of the Stole

References

Positions within the British Royal Household